Tender Loving Care is a 1966 album by Nancy Wilson, arranged by Billy May. Jason Ankeny of AllMusic wrote: "Wilson is at her best here, taking full command of the familiar songs and re-animating them with vocals that are bold, sophisticated, and daringly adult."

Track listing

Side 1 
 "Don't Go to Strangers" (Arthur Kent, David Mann, Redd Evans) - 2:52
 "Gee, Baby, Ain't I Good to You" (Don Redman, Andy Razaf) - 2:28                                          
 "Your Name Is Love" (Gene de Paul, Charles Rinker) - 2:15                                      
 "Too Late Now" (Burton Lane, Alan Jay Lerner) - 2:58                                                          
 "Like Someone in Love" (Jimmy Van Heusen, Johnny Burke) - 2:21
 "Tender Loving Care" (Johnny Mercer, Ronnell Bright) - 2:44

Side 2 
 "As You Desire Me" (Allie Wrubel)
 "I Want To Talk About You" (Billy Eckstine)                                        
 "Love-Wise" (Marvin Fisher, Kenward Elmslie)
 "Try A Little Tenderness" (Harry M. Woods, Jimmy Campbell, Reg Connelly)
 "Close Your Eyes" (Bernice Petkere)

Personnel

Performance
Nancy Wilson – vocals
Ronnell Bright – piano
John Collins – guitar
Buster Williams – double bass
Shelly Manne – drums
Catherine Gotthoffer – harp (1,4,10-11)
Verlye Mills – harp (3,6-7,9)
Uan Rasey – trumpet (2,5,8)
Al Porcino – trumpet (2,5,8)
Joseph Graves – trumpet (2,5,8)
James Salko – trumpet (2,5,8)
Lew McCreary – trombone (2,5,8)
Richard Noel – trombone (2,5,8)
Tommy Pederson – trombone (2,5,8)
William Schaefer – trombone (2,5,8)
Vincent DeRosa – French horn (2,5,8)
Arthur Frantz – French horn (2,5,8)
Richard Perissi – French horn (2,5,8)
James Decker – French horn (2,5,8)
Red Callender – tuba (2,5,8)

From The Music of Billy May: A Discography (Greenwood Press, 1998).

References

1966 albums
Nancy Wilson (jazz singer) albums
Albums arranged by Billy May
Albums produced by Dave Cavanaugh
Capitol Records albums

Albums recorded at Capitol Studios